William Elwood Steckler (October 18, 1913 – March 8, 1995) was a United States district judge of the United States District Court for the Southern District of Indiana.

Education and career

Born in Mount Vernon, Indiana, Steckler received a Bachelor of Laws from Indiana University Maurer School of Law in 1936 and a Juris Doctor from the same institution in 1937. He was in private practice in Indianapolis, Indiana from 1937 to 1950. He was a United States Naval Reserve officer during World War II in 1943. He was a member of the Marion County Election Board from 1946 to 1947, and of the Indiana State Election Board from 1947 to 1948. He was a public counselor of Indiana from 1949 to 1950.

Federal judicial service

On February 14, 1950, Steckler was nominated by President Harry S. Truman to a seat on the United States District Court for the Southern District of Indiana vacated by Judge Robert C. Baltzell. Steckler was confirmed by the United States Senate on April 4, 1950, and received his commission on April 7, 1950. He served as Chief Judge from 1954 to 1982 and as a member of the Judicial Conference of the United States from 1962 to 1964. He assumed senior status on December 31, 1986, serving in that capacity until his death on March 8, 1995, at his Indianapolis home from non-Hodgkin's lymphoma.

Other service

Steckler was also an adjunct faculty member of the Indiana University Maurer School of Law from 1975 to 1979.

References

Sources
 
 Wolfgang Saxon, "W. E. Steckler, 81, U.S. District Judge Serving 45th Year", ''The New York Times (March 11, 1995).

1913 births
1995 deaths
People from Mount Vernon, Indiana
Indiana University alumni
Judges of the United States District Court for the Southern District of Indiana
United States district court judges appointed by Harry S. Truman
20th-century American judges
Indiana University Bloomington faculty